George John Lionel Maduro (15 July 1916 – 8 February 1945) was a Dutch law student who served as an officer in the 1940 Battle of the Netherlands and distinguished himself in repelling the German attack on The Hague. He was posthumously awarded the medal of Knight 4th-class of the Military Order of William, the highest and oldest military decoration in the Kingdom of the Netherlands. His heroic acts are included in the Canon of the Netherlands.

The miniature city of Madurodam is named after him, as well as the Maduroplein area in Scheveningen, in The Hague.

Biography

George John Lionel Maduro was born on 15 July 1916 in Willemstad in the Dutch colony Curaçao and Dependencies. He was the only son of Joshua and Rebecca Maduro, a couple of Sephardic Jewish descent.

Maduro was 23 and a law student at Leiden University when Germany invaded the Netherlands on 10 May 1940. By a royal order on 21 November 1939 Maduro had been previously appointed to second-lieutenant-reserve in the Dutch Cavalry.

In the Battle of the Netherlands he was quartered with the Dutch Hussars in The Hague as a reserve officer. Under his command German ground troops stationed in Rijswijk were defeated and parachutists were captured.

On 15 May 1940, upon the capitulation of the Dutch military, Maduro was captured by German troops and jailed in the Oranjehotel in Scheveningen.

When he was released a half year later, the German occupation forces had required that all Jews wear the Star of David. Maduro refused to do so and joined the resistance movement. He became active in smuggling Allied pilots into the United Kingdom via Spain. After much success Maduro was eventually captured by Nazi forces and placed in jail again.

Months later, after a daring escape he rejoined the Dutch resistance but was ultimately betrayed by a Belgian collaborator and captured again, this time by the German Gestapo, who jailed him first at Saarbrücken. During an Allied bombing raid, Maduro's jail wing was directly hit, freeing him and several other prisoners from their cells. Instead of fleeing, Maduro rushed to the rescue of several injured prisoners that had been buried by rubble, likely saving their lives.

Months later, he was transferred to Dachau concentration camp. In February 1945, barely three months prior to the liberation of the camp by American troops, Maduro died of typhus. It is presumed that he is buried in the cemetery of the camp.

Legacy 

He is the only Dutch person of Antillian descent to have been awarded the Knight 4th-class of the Military Order of William, which was awarded posthumously.

After World War II, Maduro's parents donated the initial capital necessary to build Madurodam, a miniature city that opened in 1952 and which they meant to serve as a memorial in honor of George, their only son. In 1993, a scale model of Maduro's birthplace in Curaçao was built in the park. The entirety of net proceeds from the park are donated to various charities throughout the Netherlands.

A documentary about Maduro's life was made in 2001 by Alfred Edelstein.

Belgian artist Franky Drappier adapted his life into a 2016 graphic novel.

On 1 September 2022 an opera about Maduro premiered in the Hague.

Publication 
 Kathleen Brandt-Carey: Knight without fear and beyond reproach. The life of George Maduro 1916-1945. Houten, Spectrum, 2016.

References

External links

 George John Lionel Maduro, on "The Netherlands Antilles in WWII"

1916 births
1945 deaths
20th-century Sephardi Jews
Curaçao Jews
Dutch people who died in Dachau concentration camp
Dutch Jews who died in the Holocaust
Jewish military personnel
Dutch military personnel killed in World War II
Dutch resistance members
Knights Fourth Class of the Military Order of William
Leiden University alumni
Military personnel who died in Nazi concentration camps
People from Willemstad
Sephardi Jews who died in the Holocaust
Royal Netherlands Army officers
Royal Netherlands Army personnel of World War II
Spanish and Portuguese Jews